Little Man Big Band (also written Little Man, Big Band) is a Grammy-nominated album by saxophonist Jimmy Heath featuring performances recorded in 1992 and released on the Verve label.

Reception

David Dupont at Allmusic noted "Jimmy Heath brings to life his compositions, including his greatest hits "CTA" and "Gingerbread Boy," with blaring, upper register trumpets, punchy trombone countermelodies and swirling saxophone ensembles".

Track listing
All compositions by Jimmy Heath except as indicated
 "Trane Connections" - 5:04
 "Two Friends" (Bill Cosby, Stu Gardner) - 4:24
 "The Voice of the Saxophone"  - 7:46
 "Forever Sonny"  - 6:56
 "C.T.A." - 7:01
 "Ellington's Stray Horn" - 7:18
 "Gingerbread Boy" - 5:06
 "Without You, No Me" - 8:21

Personnel
Jimmy Heath - tenor saxophone, soprano saxophone, conductor
Ted Nash, Jerome Richardson - alto saxophone
Bill Easley - alto saxophone, tenor saxophone
Billy Mitchell, Loren Schoenberg - tenor saxophone
Danny Bank - baritone saxophone
John Eckert, Virgil Jones, Bob Millikan, Claudio Roditi, Lew Soloff - trumpet
Eddie Bert, John Mosca, Benny Powell - trombone
Jack Jeffers - bass trombone
Tony Purrone - guitar
Roland Hanna - piano
Ben Brown - bass
Lewis Nash - drums
Steve Kroon - percussion

References

Verve Records albums
Jimmy Heath albums
1992 albums